Bruns nystagmus is an unusual type of bilateral nystagmus most commonly occurring in patients with cerebellopontine angle tumours. It is caused by the combination of slow, large amplitude nystagmus (gaze paretic nystagmus) when looking towards the side of the lesion, and rapid, small amplitude nystagmus (vestibular nystagmus) when looking away from the side of the lesion. It occurs in 11% of patients with vestibular schwannoma, and occurs mainly in patients with larger tumours (67% of patients with tumours over 3.5 cm diameter). Bruns nystagmus is also associated with an increased incidence of balance disturbance in patients with vestibular schwannoma. It may be caused by the compression of both flocculi, the vestibular part of the cerebellum, and improvement in both the nystagmus and balance problems occur commonly after removal of the tumour.

Bruns nystagmus is named for Ludwig Bruns (1858 – 1915).

References 

Medical signs
Disorders of ocular muscles, binocular movement, accommodation and refraction